Lakeview is an unincorporated community and census-designated place (CDP) in Caddo Parish, Louisiana, United States. As of the 2010 census it had a population of 948.

It is bordered by the city limits of Shreveport to the north, east, and south.

Demographics

References

Census-designated places in Caddo Parish, Louisiana
Census-designated places in Louisiana
Populated places in Ark-La-Tex
Unincorporated communities in Shreveport – Bossier City metropolitan area